The 2020–21 Portland State Vikings men's basketball team represented Portland State University in the 2020–21 NCAA Division I men's basketball season. The Vikings, led by fourth-year head coach Barret Peery, played their home games at Viking Pavilion in Portland, Oregon as members of the Big Sky Conference. They finished the season 9-13, 6-8 in Big Sky Play to finish a tie for 7th place. They lost in the first round of the Big Sky tournament to Northern Arizona.

Previous season
The Vikings finished the 2019–20 season 18–14, 12–8 Big Sky play to finish in fourth place. Due to the ongoing coronavirus pandemic, all postseason tournaments were canceled, including the Big Sky tournament.

Roster

Schedule and results 

|-
!colspan=12 style=| Regular season

|-
!colspan=12 style=| Big Sky tournament
|-

|-

Source

References

Portland State Vikings men's basketball seasons
Portland State Vikings
Portland State Vikings men's basketball
Portland State Vikings men's basketball